Sean Declan Conrad Barrett (born 1944) is an Irish economist and former senator. He was a senior lecturer in the Department of Economics of Trinity College Dublin, and a Fellow of the college. In April 2011, he was elected to the Dublin University constituency of Seanad Éireann but narrowly lost his seat in 2016. In 2018 he was elected a Pro-Chancellor of the University of Dublin.

Academic career
A graduate of University College Dublin (undergraduate degree and doctorate) in 1973, and of McMaster University in Hamilton, Ontario, Barrett has been a member of the University of Dublin's department of Economics since 1977.

Barrett's main area of academic expertise is transport economics, particularly the civil aviation sector, including scholarship concerning Ryanair, Aer Lingus and the economics of airports, as well as the effects of regulation and deregulation. His other work concerns health economics and the economics of public policy.

Barrett is a Fellow of Trinity College, Dublin and has served several terms on its Board. His college appointments include a term as Junior Dean and Registrar of Chambers between 1986 and 2000. He is one of the vice-presidents of the debating society College Historical Society, the vice-president of Trinity's Choral Society and the President of DUBES.

He was one of the economists along with Colm McCarthy and Moore McDowell, nicknamed the Doheny & Nesbitt School of Economics, who were closely identified with the early policies of the Progressive Democrats.

Election history
Barrett has contested four Seanad Éireann elections in the three-seat Dublin University constituency. He finished fourth at the 1997 election, behind the incumbent Senators David Norris, Mary Henry and Shane Ross. At the 2002 election, he finished fifth behind the same three incumbents and his fellow future Dublin University Senator, Ivana Bacik. Barrett did not contest the 2007 Seanad election. He came fourth again in 2016.

Seanad Éireann
Barrett was elected to Seanad Éireann by the University of Dublin constituency for one term beginning in 2011. His work was  primarily on economic and education related matters, on a non-partisan basis. From 2011, he was a member of the Joint Oireachtas Committee of Inquiry into the Banking Crisis (the Banking Inquiry), the Joint Oireachtas Committee on Finance, Public Expenditure and Reform, the Joint Oireachtas Committee on Transport and Communications, the Independent University Senators technical group in Seanad Éireann, and the North/South Inter-Parliamentary Association.

In the area of Economic legislation, Barrett pushed through the Fiscal Responsibility Bill 2011 to ensure transparency in Government budgets
and the Financial Stability and Reform Bill 2013 to create regulations on the activities of banks.
He also tabled legislation with regard to Housing with the Mortgage Credit Bill 2012
and the National Mortgage and Housing Corporation Bill 2015, to ensure fair access to homeownership, address the accommodation shortage, and ensure the smooth operation of the property sector in Ireland.
In the area of Education, Barrett successfully promoted the Higher Education and Research Bill 2014 to address some of the unfinished business related to the creation of a consolidated legislative framework for higher education and research in Ireland.
and the Universities (Development and Innovation) Bill 2015 to highlight new definitions of academic freedom, proportionality of government control with respect to funding, and an innovation framework for the university sector.
Barrett also tabled the Copyright and Related Rights Bill 2015.

Publications
 1991 – The market sector in Irish transport: A report for the Confederation of Irish Industry
 1991 – Transport Policy in Ireland in the 1990s
 1987 – Flying High: Airline Prices and European Regulations
 1984 – Airports for sale: The case for competition
 1999 – John Kells Ingram (1823–1907)
 1999 – The outlook for European aviation
 2000 – The economics of competition in health insurance: The Irish case study
 2000 – Competitiveness and contestability in the Irish media sector
 2001 – Bus deregulation in Ireland
 2003 – Privatisation in Ireland
 2003 – "Privatisation Experiences in the EU"
 2004 – OECD Review of Higher Education in Ireland
 2004 – Airports and Communities in a Deregulated Market
 2006 – Europe's Congested Airspace – Time for Market Solutions
 2008 – Scalable quantum computing with atomic ensembles (with Peter P. Rohde and Thomas M. Stace)
 2009 – "The Roads of Ireland"
 2010 – The Sustained Impacts on Taxi Deregulation

References

1944 births
Living people
Members of the 24th Seanad
Independent members of Seanad Éireann
Fellows of Trinity College Dublin
Alumni of University College Dublin
McMaster University alumni
20th-century Irish economists
People from County Cork
Transport economists
Dublin University A.F.C.
Members of Seanad Éireann for Dublin University
21st-century Irish economists